Police Story may refer to:

Police Story (film series), a Hong Kong film series starring Jackie Chan
Police Story (1985 film)
Police Story 2, 1988
Police Story 3: Super Cop, 1992
Once a Cop, a 1993 spinoff film of Police Story 3: Super Cop
Police Story 4: First Strike, 1996
New Police Story, 2004
Police Story 2013, 2013 
Police Story (1952 TV series), an American anthology series
 Police Story, an unsold TV series developed in 1967 by Gene Roddenberry
Police Story (1973-77 NBC TV series)
 Flic Story (1975 film), a French film directed by Jacques Deray
Police Story (1979 film), a South Korean film directed by Lee Doo-yong
A single by Black Flag (band)
 Indian Kannada-language films directed by Thriller Manju:
Police Story (1996 film)
Police Story 2 (2007 film)
Police Story 3 (2011 film)

See also
Police Academy (disambiguation)